Dorotheus of Gaza ( Dorotheos tes Gazes; 505 – 565 or 620,) or Abba Dorotheus, was a Christian monk and abbot.

Life
He joined the monastery Abba Serid (or Abba Sveridus) near Gaza through the influence of elders Barsanuphius and John. Around 540 he founded his own monastery nearby and became abbot there. It was to the monks of this monastery that he addressed his instructions/teaching ("ascetics") of which a considerable number have survived and have been compiled into Directions on Spiritual Training, originally composed in Greek and translated in medieval Syriac, Arabic, Georgian, and Church Slavonic. It is typical that at the heading of his teachings he announces that he offers his teaching "following the death of Abba John the Prophet and the complete silence of Abba Barsanuphius". It seems that as long his holy spiritual fathers lived he thought that he should live in obedience, keep silent and not give his own teaching. Only after the demise of one and the decision of the other not to speak did he decide to record his ascetic experiences, in order to edify the monks at the new monastery. He presents his teaching looking to one sole aim, the edification of those to whom it is addressed. He is not interested in elegance of expression or style. Thus, his words are uncontrived, clear and simple. A careful study of the teachings of Abba Dorotheus shows a strict logical structure in an intelligible and analytic manner. The matters are not approached in a theoretical way, but on the basis of everyday reality and on his monastic experience. He primarily links his teaching with the Holy Scripture and often introduces the subjects by starting from a biblical quote or passage, mainly from the Old Testament. Furthermore, he uses biblical citations from both the Old and New Testament throughout the development of his thought. In his practical teaching, Abba Dorotheus does not ignore the theology of the Church. In his thought, theology and the practical-ascetic life coexist. He certainly is not interested in giving some doctrinal teaching. Nevertheless, his practical teaching is saturated by the faith of the Church. Abba Dorotheus (St. Dorotheus the Hermit of Kemet) is recognized as a saint by the Eastern Orthodox Church and Roman Catholic Church and Oriental Orthodox Church with his Feast Day on June 5 in the Roman Catholic Church, June 18 (June 5 old style) in Churches of Eastern Orthodox tradition and August 13 in the Eastern Orthodox Church.

Some instructions of Abba Dorotheus
 God's providence.

Do not wish for everything to be done according to your determination, but wish that it is how it should be, and in this way, you will attain peace with everyone. And believe that everything that happens to us, even the most insignificant, occurs through God's Providence. Then you will be able to endure everything that comes upon you without any agitation.

 Yearning toward goodness.

11. Everyone that desires salvation must not only avoid evil, but is obliged to do good, just as it says in the Psalm: "Depart from evil and do good" (Psalm 34:14). For example, if somebody was angry, he must not only not get angry, but also become meek; if somebody was proud, he must not only refrain from being proud but also become humble. Thus, every passion has an opposing virtue: pride — humility, stinginess — charity, lust — chastity, faintheartedness — patience, anger — meekness, hatred — love.

 Struggles with deficiencies.

21. Who resembles a person who satisfies his passions? He is like a person who, after being struck down with his enemy's arrows, then takes them with his hands and pierces his own heart with them. He who opposes passions is like a person that is showered with his enemy's arrows, but remains untouched because he is dressed in steel. One who has eradicated his passions, is like a person that although under a torrent of arrows, either shatters them or returns them into the hearts of his enemies — just as the Psalm states: "Their sword shall enter their own heart, and their bows shall be broken" (Psalm 37:15).

 Guarding the conscience.

23. When God created man, He planted something divine into him — a certain conception — a spark that has both light and warmth. The conception that enlightens the mind and indicates what is right and what is wrong is called conscience. Conscience is a natural law. Living in times before any written law, patriarchs and saints pleased God by following the voice of their conscience.

  Temperance, meekness.

24. Not only should we observe moderation with food, but we must also abstain from every other sin so that just as we fast with our stomach, we should fast with our tongue. Likewise, we should fast with our eyes i.e. not look at agitating things, not allow your eyes freedom to roam, not to look shamelessly and without fear. Similarly, arms and legs should be restrained from doing any evil acts.

27. It is impossible for anyone to get angry with his neighbor without initially raising himself above him, belittling him and then regarding himself higher than the neighbor.

 Sorrows and God's Providence.

24. When we suffer something unpleasant from our best friend, we know that he did not do it intentionally and that he loves us. We must think likewise of God, Who created us, for our sake incarnated, and died for our sake having endured enormous suffering. We must remind ourselves that He does everything from His goodness and from His love for us. We may think that while our friend loves us, in not having sufficient good sense in order to do everything correctly, he therefore involuntarily hurt us. This cannot be said of God because He is the highest wisdom. He knows what is good for us and accordingly, directs everything for our benefit, even in the smallest things. It can also be said that although our friend loves us and is sufficiently sensible, he is powerless to help us. But this certainly cannot be said of God, because to Him everything is possible and nothing is difficult for Him. Consequently, we know that God loves us and shows clemency toward us, that He is eternally wise and omnipotent. Everything that He does, He does for our benefit, and we should accept it with gratitude as from a Benefactor, even though it may appear to be grievous.

 Attaining spiritual peace.

29. Let us examine as to why a person sometimes gets annoyed when he hears an insult, and other times he endures it without getting agitated. What is the reason for this contrast? And is there one reason or are there several? There are several reasons, although they are all born from a main one. Sometimes it happens that after praying or completing a benevolent exercise, the person finds himself in a kind spiritual disposition and therefore, is amenable to his brother and doesn't get annoyed over his words. It also happens that a person is partial to another, and as a consequence, endures without any annoyance, everything that the individual inflicts upon him. It also happens that a person may despise the individual who wants to insult him, and therefore ignores him.

 Humility, vile thoughts. Humility.

31. Know that if a person is oppressed by some thought and he does not confess it (to his spiritual father), he will give the thought more power to oppose and torment him. If the person confesses the oppressive thought, if he opposes and struggles with it, instilling into himself the desire for the opposite to the thought, then the passion will weaken and will eventually cease to plague him. Thus with time, in committing himself and receiving assistance from God, that person will conquer the passion itself.

 Love towards your neighbor.

44. I heard of one person that when he came to one of his friends and found the room in disarray and even dirty, he would say to himself: "Blessed is this person, because having deferred his concerns for earthly cares, he has concentrated his mind that much toward Heaven, that he doesn’t even have time to tidy up his room." But when he came to another friend's place and found his room tidy and neat, he would say to himself; "The soul of this person is as clean as his room, and the condition of the room speaks of his soul." And he never judged another that he was negligent or proud, but through his kind disposition, saw good in everyone and received benefits from everyone. May the good Lord grant us the same kind disposition, so that we too may receive benefits from everyone and so that we never notice the failings of others.

Dorotheus and Dositheus
Dositheus was a disciple of Dorotheus and himself considered a Saint. The story is that as a young man Dositheus, an army page, lead a wild and dissolute life. He became curious, however, after hearing numerous stories about the city of Jerusalem and made a journey there about  520-525AD. 
It was at Golgotha that an unknown woman who turned out to be Virgin Mary struck up a conversation with him about eternal torments in hell,  which led to his converting from paganism to Christianity.  He became a monk at Gaza under the supervision of Dorotheus, who had a long and steady struggle to teach Dositheus discipline. Dorotheus was criticized by many of the monastery for his lax disciple.

Dositheus was noted, however, for his humility, self-denial and gentle and supportive ways with the sick. and he worked in the infirmary. It was probably here that he contracted tuberculosis or a similar condition.

He died about 530AD, five years after becoming a monk As he lay dying Dositheus begged Dorotheus to "pray for an early release from his sufferings". Dorotheus answered, "Have a little patience. God's mercy is near." Soon after he said to him, "Depart in peace and appear in joy before the blessed Trinity, and pray for us".After his death, Dorotheus declared that Dositheus had surpassed the rest (of his disciples) in virtue without the practice of any extraordinary austerity. 
Dositheus was Canonized, he is the patron saint of respiratory diseases and his Feast day is February 23.

See also
 List of Catholic saints

References

External links
 
 Sr. Pascale-Dominique Nau, Psychological Maturity and Spiritual Maturity: A Reading of Dorotheus of Gaza  (Rome: Lulu.com, 2012) 
 Chapter 13 of The monks of Gaza – A history of monastic spirituality by Luc Brésard, of the abbey of Citeaux
 Dorothée de Gaza, Instructions'', présentation et traduction par Sr. Pascale-Dominique Nau (Rome, 2014) 
 Dorothei episcopi Tyri qui sub Constantino magno vixit, De vita ac morte Prophetarum et Apostolorum, Synopsis Parisiis 1560
 Abba Dorotheus on the Russian Orthodox Church web-site, in English
 Venerable Abba Dorotheus of Palestine on the Orthodox Church in America web-site, in English

505 births
565 deaths
6th-century Byzantine monks
6th-century Christian saints
People from Gaza City